The wildlife of Singapore is surprisingly diverse despite its rapid urbanisation. The majority of fauna that still remains on the island exists in various nature reserves such as the Bukit Timah Nature Reserve and the Sungei Buloh Wetland Reserve.

In 1819, Singapore was mostly covered in rainforests. During that time, it still contained flora shared with the Malay Peninsula, but even then, the biodiversity of fauna was relatively low. Following the establishment of the British trading post, rapid deforestation began due to crop cultivation, and was largely completed by the 20th century. By some estimates, there has been a loss of 95% of the natural habitats of Singapore over the course of the past 183 years. Due to the deforestation, over twenty species of freshwater fish, 100 species of bird, and a number of mammals became locally extinct. A 2003 estimate puts the amount of extinct species as over 28%.

In modern times, over half of the naturally occurring fauna and flora in Singapore is present only in nature reserves, which comprise only 0.25% of Singapore's land area. Estimates made in 2003 have said that the rapid habitat destruction will culminate in a loss of 13-42% of populations in all of Southeast Asia.

To combat these problems, the Singaporean government has made the Singapore Green Plan in 1992 and the new Singapore Green Plan in 2012 to continue it. The plan aims to keep tabs on the unstable populations of fauna and flora, to place new nature parks, and to connect existing parks. In addition, there were plans to set up a "National Biodiversity Reference Centre" (now known as the National Biodiversity Centre). The last goal was reached in 2006 when the centre was founded (it also accomplished the establishment of two new nature reserves in 2002). Since its foundation it has been formulating various specific initiatives including attempts to conserve the hornbill and the rare dragonfly Indothemis limbata.

Fauna

Mammals

Singapore has roughly 80 species of mammals (out of 11 different orders) including 45 species of bat and three species of non-human primates. Currently the only introduced non-domestic mammal species in Singapore is the variable squirrel. The abundance of bats however has been decreasing rapidly due to a habitat loss of over 95%.

Birds

Singapore is the occasional home of 395 species of birds (out of which roughly 180 species are resident birds).

Reptiles

Singapore contains a relatively large number of reptiles, a total of about 110 species (4 of which are introduced). Most of the species, roughly 75 are snakes (mainly Colubrid snakes).

Amphibians

Singapore has 30 species of amphibians (out of which two species, the painted bull frog and the American bullfrog, are introduced species).

Flora

Singapore currently contains 1358 known species of native vascular plants, of which approximately 759 are critically endangered.

See also 
 Environmental issues in Singapore

References

External links
 National Biodiversity Centre, Singapore
 National Parks Board, Singapore

Biota of Singapore
Singapore